Castiglioncello del Trinoro is a village in Tuscany, central Italy, administratively a frazione of the comune of Sarteano, province of Siena. At the time of the 2016 its population was 14.

Castiglioncello del Trinoro is about 70 km from Siena and 6 km from Sarteano.

References 

Frazioni of the Province of Siena